Zee Next was a Hindi general entertainment channel established by Zee Entertainment Enterprises  which is based in India. The channel was shut down in 4 September 2008 due to low ratings and lack of investors.

Programming 
 Ek Thi Rajkumaari
 Jhoome Jiiya Re
 Pyaar Ishq Mohabbat
 Rock The Dhunn
 Rock-N-Roll Family
 Simply Sapney
 Yahaan Ke Hum Sikander
 Zinda Dil
 Kohi Apna Sa
 The Fresh Prince of Bel-Air 
 Diff'rent Strokes
 Sa Re Ga Ma Pa L'il Champs
 Shabaash India
 Arrested By Rakhi

References

External links
 Official site

Television stations in Mumbai
Zee Entertainment Enterprises
Television channels and stations established in 2007
Television channels and stations disestablished in 2009
Defunct television channels in India